Zabrody is a village in northwestern Ukraine, in Kovel Raion of Volyn Oblast, but was formerly administered within Ratne Raion. In 2001, the community had 853 residents. Postal code — 44160. KOATUU code — 724283401.

References 

Villages in Kovel Raion